Arctia tigrina is a moth of the family Erebidae. It is found on the Iberian Peninsula and the South of France and Italy.

The larvae feed on various plants, including Syringa, Euphorbia and Genista species.

This species, along with the others of the genus Atlantarctia, was moved to Arctia as a result of phylogenetic research published by Rönkä et al. in 2016.

References

External links

Moths and Butterflies of Europe and North Africa
Fauna Europaea
Lepiforum.de
Atlantarctia tigrina page from Portugal

Arctiina
Moths of Europe
Moths described in 1789
Taxa named by Charles Joseph Devillers